Gilbert Choombe (born 7 March 1992 in Choma, Zambia) is a Zambian amateur boxer. He competed in the Men's light welterweight event at the 2012 Summer Olympics but lost to Jeff Horn in the first round.

He also competed at the 2010 Youth World Championships, 2011 All-Africa Games, and 2013 World Championships.

References

External links
 

Living people
1992 births
Zambian male boxers
Light-welterweight boxers
Olympic boxers of Zambia
Boxers at the 2012 Summer Olympics
Competitors at the 2011 All-Africa Games
African Games competitors for Zambia
People from Choma District